The 1953 Segunda División de Chile was the second season of the Segunda División de Chile.

Thomas Bata was the tournament's winner.

Table

See also
Chilean football league system

References

External links
 RSSSF 1953

Segunda División de Chile (1952–1995) seasons
Primera B
Chil